Phoenicoprocta analis is a moth in the subfamily Arctiinae. It was described by Curt Schrottky in 1909. It is found in Paraguay.

References

Moths described in 1909
Euchromiina